James Thevathasan Rutnam (1905-1988) was a Sri Lankan historian, educationalist, writer, and politician.

Born in Jaffna, he was educated at the Manipay Hindu College, St. Joseph's College, Colombo and S. Thomas' College, Mount Lavinia, before entering the Ceylon University College and thereafter the Ceylon Law College for the advocates course where he was the editor of the Law Students Magazine and won the Walter Pereira Prize. J. R. Jayewardene was his contemporary. Leaving without completing his legal qualification, Rutnam became a teacher at Uva College, Badulla and Wesley College, Colombo and was the Principal of St. Xavier's College, Nuwara Eliya.

Rutnam was associated with S. W. R. D. Bandaranaike during his early days having joined Progressive Nationalist Party and the Ceylon National Congress. He unsuccessfully contested for the State Council of Ceylon from Nuwara Eliya and was defeated by E. W. Abeygunasekera in 1931, and 1936 and by M. D. Banda in the by-election that followed Abeygunasekera resignation in 1943. Rutnam unseated Banda in an election petition. He contested the 1947 general elections and the 1952 general elections from Nuwara Eliya without success. 

He is the founder of the Evelyn Rutnam Institute for Inter-Cultural Studies.

References

External links
 James T. Rutnam - a versatile servant
 Alimankada –Behind the scenes 
 
 A Biographical Introduction by James T. Rutnam
 Dr. James T. Rutnam - A true scholar By Prof. K. Indrapala 
 Dr. James T. Rutnam - a scholar and writer
 The Leading Characters in the Political Turmoil of Sinhalese-Muslim Riots of 1915 by Sachi Sri Kantha
 Rajah Rutnam — Sri Lanka’s first immigrant to US
 Dr. James T. Rutnam - a scholar and writer
 James T. Rutnam - a versatile servant by Prof. Bertram Bastiampillai
 When Sinhalese supported and Tamils opposed federalism
 A Century of Tamil Poetry in Sri Lanka
 WHO WAS JAMES T RUTNAM? 
 In Memory of James Rutnam 
 Meeting Thiru Arumugam in Toronto
 James Thevathasan Rutnam by Silan Kadirgamar
 "The House of Nilaperumal"  by James T.Rutnam

Sri Lankan Christians
Sri Lankan Tamil civil servants
Sri Lankan Tamil politicians
1905 births
1988 deaths
20th-century Sri Lankan historians
Sri Lankan Tamil historians